During the 1994–95 English football season, Wimbledon F.C. competed in the FA Premier League, their ninth successive season in the top flight, and extended their stay at this level with a ninth-place finish.

Season summary
Wimbledon failed to build upon their club-best finish of sixth place which had been achieved the previous season, but a ninth-place finish was still an excellent showing for the only Premiership club without their own home, and also with the smallest resources and fan base at this level. Joe Kinnear's men maintained their reputation as one of the hardest Premiership sides to beat, and finished above many big-spending, well-supported clubs including Arsenal, Chelsea, Sheffield Wednesday and Everton.

Wimbledon's need to sell their biggest assets was highlighted in the close season when they sold full-back Warren Barton to Newcastle United for £4 million - the most expensive defender signed by any British club. However, many of their other key assets - Dean Holdsworth, Robbie Earle and Hans Segers included - were retained for the new season to give Dons fans hope of another season giving the big boys a run for their money.

Early in the season, long-serving striker John Fashanu departed to Aston Villa for £1.35 million, only to retire at the end of the campaign. In Fashanu's place, Wimbledon bought Efan Ekoku from Norwich City; he was the club's leading goalscorer with nine league goals.

Kit
Wimbledon signed no kit manufacturing deal for the season's kit, instead producing them under their own brand. Birmingham-based electronics company Elonex became the kit sponsors.

Final league table

Results summary

Results by round

Results
Wimbledon's score comes first

Legend

FA Premier League

FA Cup

League Cup

Players

First-team squad
Squad at end of season

Left club during season

Transfers

In

Out

Transfers in:  £3,100,000
Transfers out:  £3,500,000
Total spending:  £400,000

References

Notes

Wimbledon F.C. seasons
Wimbledon